Sergei Babkov may refer to

 Sergei Babkov (basketball) (born 1967), Russian basketball player
 Sergei Babkov (painter) (1920–1993), Soviet Russian painter